Carles Salvador Vidal (born 17 September 1990) is a Spanish professional footballer who plays for CD Castellón as a central midfielder.

Club career
Salvador was born in Castellón de la Plana, Valencian Community, and joined Valencia CF's youth setup in 2007, from CD Castellón. In 2009, after finishing his formation, he was immediately loaned to Tercera División side Catarroja CF for the season.

Salvador returned to the Che in 2010, being assigned to the reserves also in the fourth division. In August 2012, he signed for Segunda División B side CD Olímpic de Xàtiva.

Salvador continued to appear in the third division in the following years, representing CD Alcoyano, UD Logroñés and Castellón. With the latter side he achieved promotion to Segunda División in 2020, contributing with 31 appearances (play-offs included).

On 12 September 2020, Salvador made his professional debut at the age of 30, starting in a 2–1 away win against SD Ponferradina.

References

External links

1990 births
Living people
Sportspeople from Castellón de la Plana
Spanish footballers
Footballers from the Valencian Community
Association football midfielders
Segunda División players
Primera Federación players
Segunda División B players
Tercera División players
Valencia CF Mestalla footballers
CD Olímpic de Xàtiva footballers
CD Alcoyano footballers
UD Logroñés players
CD Castellón footballers